The Grasshopper & the Ants, by Jerry Pinkney, is a 2015 adaptation of the classic Aesop fable where a grasshopper relaxes through Spring, Summer, and Autumn, while a colony of ants work at gathering food for the Winter, but although initially refusing the grasshopper's request for help, they relent and invite him in to share.

Reception
Booklist, in a review of The Grasshopper & the Ants, wrote "Another winner to follow his other renditions of Aesop's fables .. Pinkney's lush style and Aesop's timeless fables are an award-winning combination.". and School Library Journal found it "A lively and engaging version of a favorite Aesop fable."

Common Sense Media wrote "Though the washy watercolor and busy spreads of ants sometimes make it difficult to discern the finer details, a close reading yields benefits" and highlighted the story's message that "Art and entertainment are important, as is the sharing of bounty."

The Grasshopper & the Ants has also been reviewed by The Horn Book Magazine, Publishers Weekly, School Library Connection, and Kirkus Reviews.

Awards
2015 Best Illustrated Children's Books
2015 Parents' Choice Picture Books Award - Gold Award
2016 ALA Notable Children's Book - Younger Readers
2016 Bank Street College of Education Best Children's Books of the Year

References

2015 children's books
American picture books
Picture books by Jerry Pinkney
Works based on Aesop's Fables
Animal tales
Fictional ants
Fictional grasshoppers